Alessandro Sinno (born 17 July 1994) is an Italian male pole vaulter.

Biography
He has won three times his country's senior national championship, and with his new personal best,  ranked in the top 60, at 47th place, on the IAAF world leading list at the 11 July 2018.

Personal best
Pole vault: 5.55 m ( Foggia, 27 June 2018)

Achievements

National titles
 Italian Athletics Indoor Championships
 Pole vault: 2014, 2016, 2019

References

External links

1994 births
Living people
Italian male pole vaulters
Athletics competitors of Centro Sportivo Aeronautica Militare